All Over the Place may refer to:

 All Over the Place (The Bangles album), 1984
 All Over the Place (Mike Stern album), 2012
 All Over the Place (KSI album), 2021
 All Over the Place (TV series), a British children's programme

See also 
 Frank Caliendo: All Over the Place, a 2007 television special
 Live All Over the Place, a 2004 album by King's X